Papua Gosner Paskhalino Komboy (born May 11, 1999) is an Indonesian professional footballer who plays as a forward for Liga 2 club Persiba Balikpapan.

Club career

Persipura Jayapura
He was signed for Persipura Jayapura to play in Liga 1 in the 2018 season.

Career statistics

Club

References

External links
 Papua Komboy at Soccerway
 Papua Komboy at Liga Indonesia

1999 births
Living people
Indonesian footballers
Persipura Jayapura players
Association football forwards
People from Jayapura
Sportspeople from Papua